Men of the Sky is a 1942 American Technicolor short propaganda film, directed by B. Reeves Eason. The documentary film reenacted the training of a group of United States Army Air Forces (USAAF) pilots.

Following the attack on Pearl Harbor, Hollywood rushed to turn out films that would help to help win the war. The studios produced more than features, with countless cartoons and short subjects that were intended to inform the public, boost morale, encourage support of the Red Cross and other organizations that were helping at home and overseas or in recruitment. There were also films that were shown only to members of the armed forces. These films either trained them or entertained them.

Men of the Sky is one of the best examples of how Hollywood pitched in and worked to boost morale and also recruit men and women into military service. Along with Don DeFore and Tod Andrews, Eleanor Parker has a leading role. Each of the leads would go on to lengthy screen and television careers.

Plot
In 1942, the stories of a new group of U.S. Army Air Forces pilots are intertwined. As they receive their wings from Lt. General H.H. Arnold, each of the trainees, Cadet Frank Bickley (Tod Andrews), Cadet Dick Mathews (Don DeFore) and Cadet Jim Morgan (Ray Montgomery) recall their prewar introduction to flight training. In their first assignments as pilots, they are flying aircraft and airlifting matériel to General MacArthur in Australia.

Cast

 Tod Andrews as Cadet Frank Bickley (credited as Michael Ames)
 Eleanor Parker as Mrs. Frank Bickley
 Don DeFore as Cadet Dick Mathews
 Ray Montgomery as Cadet Jim Morgan
 Ruth Ford as Cadet Gladdens' Sweetheart
 Dave Willock as Bob "Sir Galahad" Gladdens (credited as David Willock)
 Henry H. Arnold as himself ("Hap") Arnold (uncredited)

Production
Men of the Sky was the second film short released by Warner Brothers with cooperation from the United States Army Air Force and its nascent First Motion Picture Unit, the first military unit entirely composed of professionals from the film industry. The growing demand for training films became overwhelming for Warner Brothers and the First Motion Picture Unit took over as the USAAF’s primary film production unit, releasing over 400 films before the war’s end.

Reception
Men of the Sky was typical of the propaganda films of the period produced under the auspices of the Office of War Information. The film was distributed and exhibited by Warner Bros. under the auspices of the Motion Picture Committee Cooperating for National Defense. Men of the Sky was the second wartime film short produced by Warner Brothers Studios and proved popular with audiences.

See also
 List of American films of 1942
 Ronald Reagan filmography
 First Motion Picture Unit

References

Notes

Citations

Bibliography

 Collins, Ace. Songs Sung Red, White, and Blue: The Stories Behind America's Best-Loved Patriotic Songs. New York: Harper, 2003. .
 Koppes, Clayton R. and Gregory D. Black. Hollywood Goes to War: How Politics, Profits and Propaganda Shaped World War II Movies. New York, The Free Press, 1987. .

External links
 
 

1942 films
1942 drama films
1942 short films
American aviation films
American drama films
American World War II propaganda shorts
Films about the United States Army Air Forces
Films directed by B. Reeves Eason
First Motion Picture Unit films
Warner Bros. short films
1940s English-language films
1940s American films